Istrana Air Base  is a military airport located in Istrana, Veneto, Italy. It is home to the Italian Air Force's 51º Stormo.

Overview
 132º Gruppo FBA/RECCE (132nd Fighter Bomber Reconnaissance Squadron) operating AMX International AMX's.
 451º Gruppo STO (451st Technical Support Squadron)
 551º Gruppo SLO (551st Logistic Support Squadron)
 951º Gruppo Efficienza Aeromobili (951st Maintenance Squadron)

See also

List of airports in Italy

References

External links

Italian airbases
Treviso